Eldad Regev (16 August 1980 – 12 July 2006) was an Israeli soldier abducted by Hezbollah fighters along with Ehud Goldwasser on 12 July 2006 in Israel near the Lebanese border, sparking the 2006 Lebanon War. His rank was Sergeant First Class.

On 15 July 2008, coffins containing the remains of Goldwasser and Regev were returned to Israel as part of a prisoner exchange. Israeli officials claimed an examination of the bodies determined that the two reservists were killed during the ambush. A Lebanese minister claimed the soldiers were killed during the Israeli bombing.

Biography
Eldad was born and raised in Kiryat Motzkin. He attended secondary school at the Yeshiva High School in Kiryat Shmuel, excelling in biology. His mother Tovaa died when he was in the 12th grade. Eldad volunteered for the infantry Givati Brigade. After his army service in the Israel Defense Forces, he traveled to the Far East. He later enrolled in Bar-Ilan University's pre-law preparatory course. Eldad enjoyed soccer, music and books, and played for Maccabi Neve Sha'anan Eldad F.C..

Raid

The fighting began at around 9 AM when Hezbollah launched a barrage of Katyusha rockets and mortars on Israeli towns and military positions along the Lebanese border, apparently as a diversion. A force then attacked two armored IDF Humvees patrolling near the Israeli village of Zar'it with anti-tank rockets, killing three soldiers and abducting the two others (Goldwasser and Regev), then retreating into Lebanon near the town of Ayta al-Sha`b. 

An Israeli Merkava Mk. II tank was destroyed by a 200–300 kg IED while attempting to pursue the soldiers into Lebanon, killing all four crewmembers. An eighth soldier, Sgt. Nimrod Cohen, was reportedly killed attempting to retrieve their bodies.

Prisoner swap

On 16 July 2008, Hezbollah transferred the coffins of the two abducted Israeli soldiers, Ehud Goldwasser and Eldad Regev, in exchange for Samir Kuntar and four other Hezbollah members captured by Israel during the 2006 Lebanon War, as well as the remains of 199 Lebanese and Palestinians.

See also

Ehud Goldwasser
Gilad Shalit
Israeli MIAs

References

External links
 Official site about the 2006 MIAs (Shalit, Goldwasser, Regev), banim.org; accessed 22 November 2014.
 Our Boys: Downloadable AIM icons to show support and raise awareness
 Event of Two Israeli Soldiers Kidnapped, Ynetnews; accessed 22 November 2014.

1980 births
2006 deaths
2006 Lebanon War
Israeli soldiers
Israeli people taken hostage
People from Kiryat Yam
Place of death unknown
Israeli military personnel killed in action